PP-290 Dera Ghazi Khan-III is a Constituency of Provincial Assembly of Punjab.

General elections 2018

See also
 PP-289 Dera Ghazi Khan-II
 PP-291 Dera Ghazi Khan-IV

References

External links
 Election commission Pakistan's official website
 Awazoday.com check result
 Official Website of Government of Punjab

Provincial constituencies of Punjab, Pakistan